is a Japanese impressionist (monomane tarento).

Hori is represented with Horipro Com of Horipro.

Biography
Hori was part of the handball club when he was at high school. He was also part of an advertising group during his college years and served as chairman during his third year. After graduating from university and worked as a salary worker at a sales promotion company Hori entered the entertainment industry. His first television appearance Waratte Iitomo!s Shirōto monomane Corner.  Hori also has experience as an anime voice actor and appeared in some works. His voice acting debut was Kinyō Road Show's Angel Tactics in 2005. Hori later voiced Junpei Takiguchi's "evil boss" roles in the Time Bokan Series after he died in 2011.

On 16 April 2005 during his final appearance in TV Oja Manbō he announced that he was married.  From 20 February to 20 April 2006 Hori performed MSN's Hori no Bakushō monomane 100 Renpatsu

As Shiroi City furusato ambassador, he took the office at the Imprint of the Imperial Housekeeper as a police chief for a day at 4 October 2015, and called the crime prevention and people gathered for the Inzai Chiku Bōhan Festa 2015 held at a commercial facility in Inzai.

Filmography
TV programmes
Current appearancesRegular programmesOccasional programmes'

Former appearances

Radio

Advertisements

Anime television

Anime films

Films

Impressions
Takaaki Ishibashi
Ijiri Okada
Miyuki Imori
Udo Suzuki
Yo Oizumi
Cha Katō (The Drifters)
Eiko Kano
Takuya Kimura (SMAP)
Yoshio Kojima
Ayumu Goromaru
Fumiyo Kohinata
Masato Sakai
Michiko Shimizu
Ken Shimura (The Drifters)
Shigeru Joshima (Tokio)
Shōfukutei Tsurube II
Junpei Takiguchi
Tetsuya Takeda
Dandy Sakano
Hōsei Tsukitei
Tetsurō Degawa
Jimon Terakado
Terry Ito
Tonikaku Akarui Yasumura
Akira Nakao
Hanawa
Masaru Hamaguchi
Ai Haruna
Eiji Bandō
Bibiru Ōki
Sei Hiraizumi
Masaharu Fukuyama
Takashi Fujii
Gin Maeda
Matsuko Deluxe
Kunihiro Matsumura
Monta Mino
Hironari Yamazaki
You
Yūsuke Santamaria

Discography

Videography

References

External links
 
Talent Databank interview 

Japanese impressionists (entertainers)
Japanese male voice actors
People from Shiroi
Actors from Chiba Prefecture
1977 births
Living people